Tempus fugit is a Latin phrase, usually translated into English as "time flies". The expression comes from line 284 of book 3 of Virgil's Georgics, where it appears as fugit inreparabile tempus: "it escapes, irretrievable time". The phrase is used in both its Latin and English forms as a proverb that "time's a-wasting".

Usage

Tempus fugit is typically employed as an admonition against sloth and procrastination (cf. carpe diem) rather than an argument for licentiousness (cf. "gather ye rosebuds while ye may"); the English form is often merely descriptive: "time flies like the wind", "time flies when you're having fun".

The phrase is a common motto, particularly on sundials and clocks.  It also has been used on gravestones.

Some writers have attempted rebuttals: 
Time goes, you say? Ah, no! alas, time stays, we go.  by H(enry) Austin Dobson 1840–1921.
'Hêd Amser! / Meddi Na! / Erys Amser / Dyn Â' on sundial at Univ of Bangor, North Wales. says the sundial was commissioned by Sir William Henry Preece, and offers an English equivalent: 
Time flies, thou sayest - Nay!  Man flies; Time still doth stay. 
Another English version is: Time Flies, Say Not So: Time Remains,'Tis Man Must Go.

In the Georgics
The phrase's full appearance in Virgil's Georgics is:

See also
 Time flies like an arrow; fruit flies like a banana
 Ars longa, vita brevis
 Carpe diem
 Got a Lot o' Livin' to Do!, sung by Elvis Presley, in which "times a wasting" appears as a lyric.
 Memento mori

References

External links 

 

Latin mottos
Latin words and phrases
Time management
Virgil